The Constitutional Bloc was a political alliance in Bulgaria in the early 1920s. It was formed by parties that opposed the ruling Bulgarian Agrarian National Union (BANU) in the early 1920s.

History
The alliance was formed on 6 July 1922 by the United People's Progressive Party, the Democratic Party and the Radical Democratic Party, and aligned itself with the People's Alliance. It also launched a new newspaper called Slovo (Word).

The alliance won 17 seats in the April 1923 elections, and also ran a joint list with the Bulgarian Social Democratic Workers Party (Broad Socialists) that failed to win a seat. However, its most prominent leaders were arrested and held prisoner on charges of being responsible for the defeats in the Second Balkan War and World War I. As a result, the party engineered a coup d'état that overthrew the BANU government.
In August most of the alliance's leadership joined the new Democratic Alliance, after which it was dissolved.

References

Defunct political party alliances in Bulgaria
Political parties established in 1922
Political parties disestablished in 1923
1922 establishments in Bulgaria
1923 disestablishments in Bulgaria